Prince Basundhara Bir Bikram Shah of Nepal, GCMG (25 November 1921 – 31 August 1977) was a son of King Tribhuvan of Nepal.

Life

Prince Basundhara was a son of King Tribhuvan and his second wife Queen Ishwari. The prince was educated under private tutors.

Flamboyant and handsome, Prince Basundhara was, in his day, one of the most popular members of the Nepalese royal family. The prince was greatly interested in sports. From 1962 to 1975, he was the president of Nepal Olympic Committee; he also served as the president of Royal Nepal Golf Club, and, from 1961 to 1975, was the chairman of National Sports Council.

He married Helen Rajya Lakshmi Devi on 17 June 1945 in Kathmandu, and they had three daughters:

Princess Jayanti of Nepal (1946–2001), she was killed in the Nepalese royal massacre.
Ketaki Chester (born on 14 January 1948 in Kathmandu), she renounced her titles of Princess and Rajya Lakshmi Devi on her second marriage to a British airline pilot. 
Princess Jyotshana of Nepal.

He also married Ramola Devi (1923–2000), a writer [pen name Chhinnalata], in 1948 and they had a son and a daughter:

 Prince N. Bikram Shah.
 Princess Jyoti Rajya Lakshmi Devi Singh (born on 25 November 1954).

Prince Basundhara died on 31 August 1977, at the Bir Hospital, Kathmandu.

Honours

National honours
 Member of the Order of Ojaswi Rajanya (1951).
 Tribhuvan Order of the Footprint of Democracy, 1st class (30 September 1959).
 Member of the Order of the Star of Nepal, 1st class.
 Member of the Order of Om Rama Patta.
 King Mahendra Coronation Medal (2 May 1956).
 King Birendra Coronation Medal (24 February 1975).

Foreign honours

  : Honorary Grand Cross of the Order of St Michael and St George [GCMG].

Ancestry

References

Nepalese princes
1921 births
1977 deaths
Nepalese royalty
Recipients of the Order of the Star of Nepal
Knights Grand Cross of the Order of St Michael and St George
20th-century Nepalese nobility
Nepalese Hindus